is a retired Japanese ski jumper and Nordic combined skier. He won a silver medal in the individual large hill event at the 1966 FIS Nordic World Ski Championships in Oslo, becoming the first Japanese ski jumper to win a medal at the world championships. He placed 20th in the Nordic combined at the 1964 Winter Olympics and 8th–18th in the large hill event at the 1968–1976 Olympics.

References

External links

1943 births
Japanese male ski jumpers
Japanese male Nordic combined skiers
Olympic ski jumpers of Japan
Olympic Nordic combined skiers of Japan
Nordic combined skiers at the 1964 Winter Olympics
Ski jumpers at the 1968 Winter Olympics
Ski jumpers at the 1972 Winter Olympics
Ski jumpers at the 1976 Winter Olympics
Living people
FIS Nordic World Ski Championships medalists in ski jumping
Universiade medalists in nordic combined
Universiade medalists in ski jumping
Sportspeople from Hokkaido
People from Yoichi, Hokkaido
Universiade bronze medalists for Japan
Competitors at the 1964 Winter Universiade
Competitors at the 1966 Winter Universiade